Giles County is the name of two counties in the United States: 

 Giles County, Tennessee 
 Giles County, Virginia